Chitham is an English surname, a variant of Cheetham, probably derived from Cheetham in Lancashire, now part of Manchester.

Notable people
Sir Charles Carter Chitham (1886–1972), a British policeman who served mostly in India
Claire Chitham (born 1978), a New Zealand actress
Robert Chitham (1935/36–2017), a British architect and writer

See also
Chetham
Cheetham (surname)
Cheatham (surname)

Chitham